Gabriel Torres (born 6 January 1996) is a Brazilian footballer who currently plays for Phoenix Rising FC in the USL Championship.

Career

UDC
Torres played three years of college soccer at the University of the District of Columbia from 2016 to 2018. While playing with the Firebirds, Torres made 55 appearances, scoring 34 goals and tallying 21 assists.

The Villages SC
During his 2018 season, Torres appeared for USL PDL side The Villages SC.

Chattanooga FC
Following college, Torres joined NPSL side Chattanooga FC for their 2019 season.

Hartford Athletic
On 9 December 2019, Torres joined USL Championship side Hartford Athletic ahead of their 2020 season. He made his debut on 20 July 2020, starting against Loudoun United. He scored his first professional goal on July 25, 2020 against Philadelphia Union II and was named to USL Championship Team of the Week. He finished the season with two goals and six assists in Hartford's fifteen regular season and postseason games. He was re-signed with the club for the 2021 season in December 2020.

FC Tulsa
On 18 January 2022, Torres signed with USL Championship side FC Tulsa.

Phoenix Rising FC
On 23 September 2022, Torres signed with Phoenix Rising FC.

References

External links
 
 
 UDC Firebirds bio

1996 births
Living people
Association football defenders
Brazilian footballers
Brazilian expatriate sportspeople in the United States
Expatriate soccer players in the United States
The Villages SC players
Chattanooga FC players
Hartford Athletic players
USL League Two players
National Premier Soccer League players
USL Championship players
FC Tulsa players
Phoenix Rising FC players
Sportspeople from Salvador, Bahia